During the 2006–07 Scottish football season, St. Mirren competed in the Scottish Premier League.

Season summary
Back in the Scottish Premier League, St Mirren avoided relegation by four points.

Final league table

First-team squad
Squad at end of season

Left club during season

See also
List of St Mirren F.C. seasons

Notes

References

St. Mirren F.C.
St Mirren F.C. seasons
2006–07 in Scottish football